Indonesia – Papua New Guinea relations are foreign relations between Indonesia and Papua New Guinea, two bordering countries north of Australia.

Indonesia and Papua New Guinea share a  border that has raised tensions and ongoing diplomatic issues over many decades.

Indonesia is represented in Papua New Guinea with an embassy in Port Moresby and a consulate in Vanimo, while Papua New Guinea is represented in Indonesia with an embassy in Jakarta.  Both nations are members of APEC, Non-Aligned Movement and the United Nations.

Country comparison

History 
Dutch colonial and Indonesian government actions over the populations in western Papua region have caused an extensive and ongoing border issue which has a lengthy and enduring presence of refugees moving between Papua and Papua New Guinea.

Leo Suryadinata writes that after "a number of border conflicts, Indonesia eventually signed a border treaty with Papua New Guinea in 1979"; however, issues continued while Indonesia pursued Papuans well after this date, and still continue to harass various population groups in the highlands of Papua adjacent to the border with Papua New Guinea. The border is a straight line, drawn without considering the geological features, except for a slight indentation to the west at the Fly River, created in 1893 to allow for better British policing of the area.

Sean Dorney of the Australian Broadcasting Corporation in his book Papua New Guinea — people, Politics and History since 1975 has the quote from a statements by the Indonesian Embassy in Port Moresby in 1978 in relation to the pursuit of Papuan rebels:

Indonesia wants PNG to grow strong and be a good neighbour. Therefore if there is a dream that we want to invade Papua New Guinea, we would do it now when Papua New Guinea is still weak, rather than to wait (for) Papua New Guinea to become strong

Trade 
Trade between the two countries amounted to US$ 256 million in 2018, with the trade balance being strongly favourable to Indonesia. A preferential trade agreement between the two countries have been considered. Vanilla is one commodity exported from PNG to Indonesia.

Refugees
Due to conflict adjacent to the border between the two countries, refugees have crossed the border regularly.

The main issue of refugees is from conflict between Indonesian national security forces, and various groups of disaffected groups in West Papua seeking refuge in the Papua New Guinea territory.

The subsequent diplomatic issues that have arisen, usually is the refugee flows and border transgressions by Indonesian forces.

Its (PNG) proximity and cultural ties to the Indonesian province of Papua means there is potential for a mass influx of West Papuan refugees. Given the continuing political instability and the security situation in Papua, regular revision of PNG's contingency plans and training of GoPNG officials is considered important.

Treaty
Talks about the border moved to the signing on 27 October 1986, of the Treaty of Mutual Respect, Cooperation, and Friendship

The treaty was, in effect, a bilateral nonaggression pact in which the two sides agreed to "avoid, reduce and contain disputes or conflicts between their nations and settle any differences that may arise only by peaceful means"*"http://epress.anu.edu.au/sspng/mobile_devices/ch14.html 'Mutual Respect, Friendship and Cooperation'? The Papua New Guinea-Indonesia Border and its Effect on Relations Between Papua New Guinea and Indonesia"

See also 
 141st meridian east
 Foreign relations of Indonesia
 Foreign relations of Papua New Guinea
 Indonesia–Papua New Guinea border

References

Further reading 
 Beverley Blaskett, "Papua New Guinea-Indonesia Relations: A New Perspective on the Border Conflict," PhD thesis, Australian National University, February 1989.
 International Boundary Study No. 160 – February 7, 1977 Indonesia – Papua New Guinea Boundary

 
Papua New Guinea
Bilateral relations of Papua New Guinea